Hong Kong Supermarket is an  Asian American supermarket chain started in the San Gabriel Valley region of Southern California.  It operates mainly in the newer suburban overseas Chinese communities, particularly in the Los Angeles, Philadelphia, and New York City areas.  Hong Kong Supermarket specializes mainly in imported Asian groceries. Many items are from Mainland China, Hong Kong, Macau, Japan, South Korea, Thailand, Taiwan, Vietnam, Indonesia, and the Philippines.

The supermarket caters to a specific customer base. The first store in Monterey Park, California, was a popular destination for Mainland Chinese emigres, and the Hong Kong Supermarkets in New York City focus on Mainland Chinese immigrant customers (large community of mainlanders in Brooklyn).

Hong Kong Supermarket was established in 1981 by Jeffrey Wu with its former flagship store located in Monterey Park, California, where it is still among the popular Asian supermarkets, and is headquartered in New York City. It is currently owned by Jeffrey Wu (胡兆明) and his wife, former Hong Kong actress Veronica Yip.  In Southern California, its main competitors were 99 Ranch Market and Shun Fat Supermarket. In the New York City area, it competes with Kam Man Food, Good Fortune Supermarket, New York Mart, and Great Wall Supermarket.  In Boston, it competes with Kam Man, H Mart, and C-Mart.

In 2009, Hong Kong purchased Super 88, an Asian supermarket chain which had already closed three of its six stores in 2008, citing poor sales.  Super 88 had also faced increasing competition and a $200,000 settlement after violating state wage and hour laws.

The chain sold much of its stores to the Good Fortune Supermarket chain.

Locations

Georgia
Norcross - 5495 Jimmy Carter Blvd
Massachusetts
Boston - 1095 Commonwealth Avenue
Malden - 188 Commercial St
New York
Chinatown, Manhattan - 157 Hester Street

Defunct locations
California
Monterey Park - 127 N Garfield Ave (became a Good Fortune Supermarket)
Rowland Heights (now HK2 Food District)
San Gabriel (now a Good Fortune Supermarket)
West Covina (now HK2 Food District)
West Covina (now East West Supermarket)
Monrovia (now a Good Fortune Supermarket)
Massachusetts
Allston, Massachusetts
Dorchester, Massachusetts
New Jersey
South Plainfield (closed in 2002)
East Brunswick
New York
Chinatown, Manhattan (East Broadway Location)(destroyed by fire on May 14, 2009) (now a Chinatown Supermarket Of Manhattan and a Fairfield Inn Hotel above) 
Sunset Park (now a iFresh Market)
Elmhurst (now a US Supermarket)
Flushing (now a SuperHK Supermarket, part of Good Fortune Supermarket)
Pennsylvania
Philadelphia (now a Hong Kong Hypermarket)
Louisiana
Gretna (now a Hong Kong Food Market)

References

External links

Asian-American culture in California
Chinese-American culture in California
Companies based in Los Angeles County, California
Hong Kong-American culture
Supermarkets of the United States
Chinese supermarkets
Retail companies established in 1981
1981 establishments in California